trans-Resveratrol-3-O-glucuronide is a metabolite of resveratrol and trans-resveratrol-3-O-glucoside (piceid).

References 

Resveratrol glycosides
Glucuronide esters
Phenol glucuronides
Phenolic human metabolites